Stefan Lord (born 4 December 1954) is a Swedish–born Thai former professional darts player who competed in events of the British Darts Organisation (BDO) in the 1970s, 1980s and 1990s, and is one of the country's most successful players.

Darts career

He competed at ten BDO World Darts Championships with his best run coming in 1982 where he finished in third place, beating Bobby George 2-1. He played in the first ever World Championship in 1978, reaching the semi finals, losing to John Lowe. His final World Championship appearance came in 1988, losing in the first round to Paul Lim.

He also reached in semi finals of the Winmau World Masters in 1981 and won the News of the World Darts Championship twice in 1978 and 1980, becoming the first (and only) overseas player to win the tournament and one of seven players to win it more than once. He finished runner-up in the 1983 North American Open. 

Lord left the BDO in 1991.

World Championship results

BDO
 1978: Semi-finals (lost to John Lowe 4–8) (legs)
 1979: 2nd round (lost to Rab Smith 1–2) (sets)
 1980: 1st round (lost to Bill Lennard 1–2)
 1981: 1st round (lost to Kevin White 1–2)
 1982: Semi-finals (lost to Jocky Wilson 0–4)
 1983: Quarter-finals (lost to Tony Brown 1–4)
 1984: 2nd round (lost to Mike Gregory 1–4)
 1985: 2nd round (lost to Cliff Lazarenko 0–3)
 1986: 1st round (lost to Jocky Wilson 0–3)
 1988: 1st round (lost to Paul Lim 0–3)

Career finals

Independent major finals: 2 (2 titles)

References

External links
Official website (archived) (in Swedish)
Profile and stats on Darts Database

1954 births
Living people
Swedish darts players
Stefan Lord
Sportspeople from Stockholm 
British Darts Organisation players